Alex Paaschen Titton (born September 25, 1990) is a Brazilian footballer.

Career

Brazil
Titton joined the youth academy of the famed Brazilian club Grêmio, with whom he played with for five seasons, before moving to the academy of their cross-town rivals, Internacional in 2007. He began his professional career in 2008 at São José of the Campeonato Brasileiro Série D, playing for two seasons for the club's reserves.

United States
While in England on a trial with Tottenham Hotspur, Titton met AC St. Louis head coach Claude Anelka, who invited him to try out with the USSF Division 2 Professional League expansion franchise. He signed with St. Louis in February 2010., and made his debut for the team on April 17, 2010, in a game against the Austin Aztex.

In August 2011 he signed at Dutch club AGOVV Apeldoorn but left the club within two months

References

1990 births
Living people
Footballers from Porto Alegre
Brazilian footballers
São José Esporte Clube players
AC St. Louis players
AGOVV Apeldoorn players
Paulista Futebol Clube players
Horizonte Futebol Clube players
Brazilian expatriate footballers
USSF Division 2 Professional League players
Association football forwards